In aerodynamics, the pitching moment on an airfoil is the moment (or torque) produced by the aerodynamic force on the airfoil if that aerodynamic force is considered to be applied, not at the center of pressure, but at the aerodynamic center of the airfoil.  The pitching moment on the wing of an airplane is part of the total moment that must be balanced using the lift on the horizontal stabilizer. More generally, a pitching moment is any moment acting on the pitch axis of a moving body.

The lift on an airfoil is a distributed force that can be said to act at a point called the center of pressure.  However, as angle of attack changes on a cambered airfoil, there is movement of the center of pressure forward and aft.  This makes analysis difficult when attempting to use the concept of the center of pressure.  One of the remarkable properties of a cambered airfoil is that, even though the center of pressure moves forward and aft, if the lift is imagined to act at a point called the aerodynamic center, the moment of the lift force changes in proportion to the square of the airspeed.  If the moment is divided by the dynamic pressure, the area and chord of the airfoil, the result is known as the pitching moment coefficient. This coefficient changes only a little over the operating range of angle of attack of the airfoil but the change in moment slope against the AOA shown in figure below seems very steep so this should be of change in pitching moment of wing about CG rather than about AC.  The combination of the two concepts of aerodynamic center and pitching moment coefficient make it relatively simple to analyse some of the flight characteristics of an aircraft.

Measurement
The aerodynamic center of an airfoil is usually close to 25% of the chord behind the leading edge of the airfoil.  When making tests on a model airfoil, such as in a wind-tunnel, if the force sensor is not aligned with the quarter-chord of the airfoil, but offset by a distance x, the pitching moment about the quarter-chord point,  is given by

where the indicated values of D and L are the drag and lift on the model, as measured by the force sensor.

Coefficient
The pitching moment coefficient is important in the study of the longitudinal static stability of aircraft and missiles.

The pitching moment coefficient  is defined as follows

where M is the pitching moment, q is the dynamic pressure, S is the wing area, and c is the length of the chord of the airfoil.
 is a dimensionless coefficient so consistent units must be used for M, q, S and c.

Pitching moment coefficient is fundamental to the definition of aerodynamic center of an airfoil.  The aerodynamic center is defined to be the point on the chord line of the airfoil at which the pitching moment coefficient does not vary with angle of attack, or at least does not vary significantly over the operating range of angle of attack of the airfoil.

In the case of a symmetric airfoil, the lift force acts through one point for all angles of attack, and the center of pressure does not move as it does in a cambered airfoil.  Consequently, the pitching moment coefficient about this point for a symmetric airfoil is zero.

The pitching moment is, by convention, considered to be positive when it acts to pitch the airfoil in the nose-up direction.  Conventional cambered airfoils supported at the aerodynamic center pitch nose-down so the pitching moment coefficient of these airfoils is negative.

See also

 Aircraft flight mechanics
 Flight dynamics
 Longitudinal static stability
 Neutral point
 Lift coefficient
 Drag coefficient

References

Bibliography
 L. J. Clancy (1975), Aerodynamics, Pitman Publishing Limited, London, 
 Piercy, N.A.V (1943) Aerodynamics, pages 384–386, English Universities Press. London
 Low-Speed Stability Retrieved on 2008-07-18

Aerodynamics
Aerospace engineering
Gliding technology